The Dodge Rampage was a subcompact unibody coupe utility based on Chrysler's L platform and manufactured from 1982 to 1984. First released as a 1982 model, the Rampage was later joined for 1983 by its rebadged variant, the Plymouth Scamp.

Description

Background 

Similar to the situation with Ford Australia and GM's Holden, Chrysler marketed commercial vehicles and coupé utilities based on their passenger car platforms only in Australia and New Zealand, thus no such vehicles were ever officially marketed in the United States.

Rebadged versions were also sold under the Fargo and DeSoto brands in both their homemarket but also a number of Commonwealth export markets. This trend continued until 1957 when Chrysler consolidiated its car-based commercial vehicles only under their own brand with the arrival of the Royal and later much popularized with the Chrysler Valiant.

In 1957 Ford brought the bodystyle into the United States with the Ranchero and GM would be quick to follow with the El Camino in 1959. Even then, Chrysler concentrated on its dedicated-truck based vehicles and did not introduced a competitor into the newly-formed segment until the Rampage and Scamp started production in 1982.

Rampage 
The Rampage borrowed the car's unibody construction and front end panels and components from the sporty Dodge Omni 024 (later renamed the Charger), using the suspension from its parent vehicles with coil struts and a linkless sway bar at the front, and leaf springs with shock absorbers unique to the Rampage at the rear.

In the first year, it had leisurely performance due to the four-speed manual transmission along with a three-speed automatic transmission.

Performance was improved with the introduction of a five-speed manual transmission in 1983. In addition to the El Camino, the Volkswagen Rabbit Sportruck and Subaru BRAT were the Rampage's main competition.

In 1984, the Rampage received a facelifted front fascia shared with the Charger, with quad 165 mm x 100 mm sealed beam headlights opposed to the dual 200 mm x 142 mm sealed beam headlights found on previous models. The grille was also changed, switching from a 6-slot design to a vertically split design. The lower bumper was switched from a pronounced part that bulged out to a more sleek design with near-flush indicators, a horizontally split lower air intake, and an impact strip that wrapped around the front clip.

A rebadged version, the Plymouth Scamp, was only marketed for 1983. The Rampage lasted three years before being dropped from production after the 1984 model year. There was a "Shelby Rampage" built by Chrysler/Shelby engineers in their free time for Carroll Shelby, but there is no official record of the existence of such a vehicle. However, a special California market "Direct Connection" Rampage was built in 1984 and only sold at certain California-area Dodge dealerships, which featured the front fascia from the Shelby Charger, 15-inch alloy wheels, and a ground effects package.

Only 250 "Direct Connection" Rampages were produced.  
1/3 Black
1/3 Garnet Red
1/3 Santa Fe Blue

The Dodge Rampage (17,636 sold in 1982, 8,033 in 1983, and 11,732 in 1984) didn't take off in the market as had been expected. Sales totals for the Plymouth Scamp were 2,184 base models and 1,380 Scamp GT models.

2006 concept

Dodge resurrected the Rampage name at the 2006 Chicago Auto Show with a front-wheel drive concept pickup. As opposed to the original Rampage, this concept vehicle was as large as the full-size Dodge Ram. It was powered by the 5.7 L Hemi V8 and featured "Stow 'n Go" seating taken from the Chrysler minivans.

References

Rampage
Front-wheel-drive vehicles
Coupé utilities
Cars introduced in 1982
Cars discontinued in 1984